Asian Highway 46 (AH46)  is a route of the Asian Highway Network within India, from Kharagpur in West Bengal to Dhule in Maharashtra. The route is part of old National Highway 6.

This highway connects Dhule-Jalgaon-Akola-Amravati-Nagpur-Bhandara-Durg-Bhilai-Raipur-Saraipali-Bargarh-Sambalpur (Odisha)- Debagarh -
Kendujhar-Baharagora (Jharkhand)-Kharagpur (West Bengal).

Route in India
Length of AH46 is 1514 km. Various cities and towns in the Indian states of West Bengal, Jharkhand, Odisha, Chhattisgarh and Maharashtra lie on AH46 as follows:

West Bengal State
Kharagpur

Dhulia, Akola, Amravati, Nagpur, Raipur, Sambalpur, 2Root Cattuk, Bhadrak Khadkpur

Odisha State
Bargarh
Sambalpur
Jharpokharia, Baripada
Kendujhargarh
Debagarh

Chhattisgarh State
Saraipali
Raipur
Bhilai
Rajnandgaon

Maharashtra State
Bhandara
Nagpur
Amravati
Akola
Khamgaon
Nandura
Malkapur
Bhusawal
Jalgaon
Dhule

Constituent highways 
AH46 is located entirely within India. National highways have been renumbered since 2010.

New numbered highways 
Kharagpur - Deogarh section is part of National Highway 49 (India)
Deogarh - Dhule section is part of National Highway 53 (India)

Old numbers
Under old numbers, AH46 was part of old NH6 India.

Junctions 
  near Kharagpur, starting point.
  near Nagpur.
  near Dhule, end point.

References

Asian Highway Network
Roads in India